The 2017 Teen Choice Awards ceremony was held on August 13, 2017. The awards celebrated the year's achievements in music, film, television, sports, fashion, comedy, and the Internet, and were voted on by viewers aged 13 to 19 through various social media sites. A three-hour musical festival called "Teen Fest" and hosted by Jake Paul was streamed exclusively on YouTube with some of the event appearing during the Teen Choice broadcast. Throughout the show, several celebritiesincluding Vanessa Hudgens, Zendaya and Lauren Jauregui of Fifth Harmonyaddressed the aftermath of the 2017 Unite the Right rally and encouraged teens to speak out against violence and hate.

Performers
 Louis Tomlinson ft. Bebe Rexha & Digital Farm Animals — "Back to You"
 Clean Bandit ft. Zara Larsson — "Rockabye" and "Symphony"
 Rita Ora — "Your Song"
 Kyle ft. Lil Yachty - "iSpy" and "Forever Young"
 French Montana & Rae Sremmurd - "Unforgettable" & "Black Beatles'"
 Cast of Star - "Can't Think About You"

Presenters
 The Dolan Twins
 Lucy Hale
 Janel Parrish
 Chris Pratt
 Tyler Posey
 Yara Shahidi
 Hudson Yang
 Fifth Harmony
 Logan Paul
 Anthony Anderson
 Cast of Riverdale

Winners and nominees
The first wave of nominations were announced on June 19, 2017. The second wave was announced on July 12, 2017. Winners are listed first, in bold. Other nominees are in alphabetical order.

Movies

Television

Movies and television

Music

Digital

Fashion

Sports

Miscellaneous

References

External links

Teen Choice Awards
Teen Choice
2017 in Los Angeles
July 2017 events in the United States